Don Calder (29 November 1927 – 25 December 2006) was an Australian rules footballer who played with Carlton in the Victorian Football League (VFL). Calder was captain of Carlton's 1953 Second 18 premiership team.

He joined Wodonga as captain-coach for the 1954 and 1955 Ovens & Murray Football League season.

Notes

External links 

Don Calder's profile at Blueseum

1927 births
Carlton Football Club players
Australian rules footballers from Victoria (Australia)
Wodonga Football Club players
Wodonga Football Club coaches
2006 deaths